Roy Albert Crowson (22 November 1914 in Hadlow, Kent – 13 May 1999) was an English biologist who specialised in the taxonomy of beetles.

He lectured at the Zoology Department of the University of Glasgow from 1949. He collected beetles and their larvae from around the world and studied the relationships between them. His 1955 monograph, The natural classification of the families of Coleoptera, established a system for the classification of beetles that remains in use.

His collections of British Coleoptera are in the Hunterian Museum, Glasgow, and his collections of world families, including large quantities of microscope slides and dissections, in the Natural History Museum, London.

The beetle genus Crowsoniella is named in his honour.

Family 
Crowson worked closely with his wife, Elizabeth Anne Crowson, who was also a respected naturalist as well as a university lecturer in botany. They frequently collected and published papers together.

Works
 The natural classification of the families of Coleoptera, Nathaniel Lloyd & Co., Ltd., London, 1955.
 Coleoptera: introduction and key to families, Handbooks for the identification of British insects, Royal Entomological Society of London, London, 1957. pdf
 Classification and biology, Heinemann Educational Books Ltd, London, 1970.
 Biology of the Coleptera, Academic Press, 1981.

References

External links
 R. A. Crowson: complete list of publications

1914 births
1999 deaths
English coleopterists
20th-century British zoologists
People from Hadlow
Alumni of Imperial College London
Academics of the University of Glasgow
English curators